German submarine U-2348 was a Type XXIII U-boat of Nazi Germany's Kriegsmarine during World War II. She was ordered on 20 September 1944, and was laid down on 22 September 1944 at Deutsche Werft AG, Hamburg, as yard number 502. She was launched on 11 November 1944 and commissioned under the command of Oberleutnant zur See Georg Goschzik on 4 December 1944.

Design
Like all Type XXIII U-boats, U-2348 had a displacement of  when at the surface and  while submerged. The submarine was powered by one MWM six-cylinder RS134S diesel engine providing , one AEG GU4463-8 double-acting electric motor electric motor providing , and one BBC silent running CCR188 electric motor providing .

U-2348 was fitted with two  torpedo tubes in the bow. She could carry two preloaded torpedoes. The complement was 14–18 men. This class of U-boat did not carry a deck gun.

Service history
On 9 May 1945, U-2348 surrendered at Stavanger, Norway. She was later transferred to Loch Ryan, Scotland on 27 May 1945. Of the 156 U-boats that eventually surrendered to the Allied forces at the end of the war, U-2348 was not one of 116 selected to take part in Operation Deadlight. U-2348 was broken up in Belfast in April 1949.

See also
 Battle of the Atlantic

References

Bibliography

External links

U-boats commissioned in 1944
World War II submarines of Germany
1944 ships
Type XXIII submarines
Ships built in Hamburg